Jacob Preston Carnahan (September 22, 1832 – July 16, 1912) was an American Confederate officer, a professor of mathematics, and Populist politician.

Early life
Carnahan was born in Canehill, Arkansas on September 22, 1832.  He attended the Cane Hill School and  graduated from Cumberland University in Lebanon, Tennessee.

Civil War
Carnahan was a captain in the Confederate States Army during the American Civil War, he commanded Company G of the 16th Arkansas Infantry Regiment, involved in the bloody Battle of Elkhorn Tavern, also known as the Battle of Pea Ridge.

Educator
He was a professor of mathematics at Cane Hill College, formerly Cane Hill School from 1869 to 1883.

Politician
He was candidate for governor with the People's Party of Arkansas in 1892, receiving 31,116 of 156,186 (20%) votes, losing to Democrat William Meade Fishback and winning narrowly fewer votes than Republican mayor of Little Rock, William G. Whipple.

Personal life
He was married to Susan Amelia Crawford Carnahan. They had five children, three daughters Evalyn "Eve" Carnahan (Quailie), Mary Clementine "Clem" Carnahan (Moore), Susan E. Carnahan (Rogers), and sons Rev. Alfred E. Carnahan of Cane Hill and James Crawford Carnahan. He died July 16, 1912 at the home of his youngest daughter, Mrs. Susan Rogers, near Prairie Grove. He was buried at Cane Hill..

References

External links
 

1832 births
1912 deaths
Confederate States Army officers
Arkansas Populists
Mathematicians from Arkansas
Cumberland University alumni